Atte Sihvonen (born 18 February 1996) is a Finnish footballer who plays as a defender for Haka.

Career

Club
On 21 December 2018, Sihvonen signed for RoPS on a one-year contract, with the option of an additional year.

On 10 December 2021, he signed a two-year deal with Haka.

References

External links

1996 births
Living people
Finnish footballers
Association football defenders
Åbo IFK players
Myllykosken Pallo −47 players
Salon Palloilijat players
Ekenäs IF players
Rovaniemen Palloseura players
Turun Palloseura footballers
FC Haka players
Kakkonen players
Ykkönen players
Veikkausliiga players